The men's long jump event at the 1975 Summer Universiade was held at the Stadio Olimpico in Rome on 18 and 19 September.

Medalists

Results

Qualification

Final

References

Athletics at the 1975 Summer Universiade
1975